Jonathan David Schnepp (May 16, 1967 – July 19, 2018) was an American producer, director, voice actor, editor, writer, animator, and media host.

Schnepp was known for the documentary film The Death of "Superman Lives": What Happened?, which he directed and wrote. He also directed episodes of Metalocalypse, The Venture Bros. and a segment of The ABCs of Death. He was also known for his work with Collider, appearing regularly as a panelist on the site's Collider Movie Talk, Collider Nightmares, and Collider Heroes series, the latter of which he hosted. His company, Schneppzone, works on short films and television series.

Schnepp died on July 19, 2018, due to complications following a stroke.

Career
Schnepp served as animation director for Nickelodeon's What's Inside Heidi's Head?, and as editor on numerous episodes of Cartoon Network's Space Ghost Coast to Coast.  He co-directed the pilot for Upright Citizens Brigade for Comedy Central, and directed segments and the title sequence for the series run. He also released The Removers and Brainwarp, two pilots he produced and directed, on DVD by Film Threat.  He then went to Brazil, working with Debbie Allen, editing and creating the title sequences for two sitcoms airing in São Paulo and Rio de Janeiro. Schnepp co-created, co-wrote, and directed Nerd Hunter 3004 for the Channel 101 pilot. He also guest stars as a voice actor on three episodes of Aqua Teen Hunger Force. In two episodes he voices the Wisdom Cube and in the other he plays The Creature from Plaque Lagoon.

From 2006 to 2012, Schnepp served as director on Metalocalypse, an animated series on Cartoon Network about Dethklok, a chiefly-fictional heavy metal band.  As well as directing several episodes per season (the most recent of which aired in 2012), he designed and created the look of the five band members, and works closely with the show's co-creators/writers Brendon Small and Tommy Blacha. He directed the 2009 Dethklok Tour with Mastodon, providing an animated accompaniment. Schnepp helped write all four Dethklok comic books, and designed variant cover arts.

Schnepp co-directed Season 4.1 of The Venture Bros.  Schnepp was featured in The Damned Things' music video for "We've Got a Situation Here".

In 2011, Schnepp directed music videos for the bands I Set My Friends on Fire and Forbidden. In a 2012 Dread Central interview, he spoke of directing an upcoming animated horror film Grimm Fairy Tales.

From 2012 to 2015, Schnepp was a regular contributor to AMC Movie Talk on YouTube, an online show dedicated to film news and commentaries. After the series' cancellation by AMC Theatres and subsequent pickup by Collider, Schnepp remained as a regular contributor.

In 2015, Schnepp directed the documentary film The Death of "Superman Lives": What Happened?, which documents behind-the-scenes events surrounding the cancelled Tim Burton film Superman Lives. Partially raised through a successful Kickstarter campaign, it premiered on May 1, 2015, and was released through VOD on July 9, 2015, to positive reviews.

Death
On July 12, 2018, Schnepp suffered a massive stroke that left him unconscious and on life support. He died of complications a week later on July 19, aged 51.

Selected filmography

Film, television, and web

Music videos

References

External links 

 
 

1967 births
2018 deaths
American television producers
American male voice actors
American documentary film directors
American documentary film producers
American music video directors
American film producers
AMC Theatres
American film editors
People from West Haven, Connecticut